1831 Naval Air Squadron (1831 NAS) was a Naval Air Squadron of the Royal Navy's Fleet Air Arm. The squadron was formed in 1943 in Rhode Island as a fighter squadron, before being disbanded, reformed and disbanded again after its return to Britain in 1946. It saw no combat during the Second World War. 

The squadron was reformed a year later, as part of the Royal Navy Volunteer Reserve where in 1955 it became the first jet-equipped squadron of the Royal Navy Volunteer Reserve, before being disbanded in 1957. It was later briefly reformed between 1980-81 to assist in training aircrew.

Second World War
1831 Naval Air Squadron initially formed on 1 July 1943 at NAS Quonset Point on Rhode Island, equipped with Lend-Lease supplied Vought Corsair fighters. It crossed the Atlantic to Britain in October, but was disbanded on 10 December 1943, when it was broken up to re-inforce 1830 and 1833 Naval Air Squadrons. It reformed on 1 November 1944, again as a Corsair-equipped squadron, at another American naval base, this time NAS Brunswick in Maine. The Squadron returned to Britain in February 1945, embarking on the aircraft carrier  which sailed to join the British Pacific Fleet in May 1945. By the time Glory reached the Pacific, the Second World War was almost over, and the ship's Naval Air Wing, including 1831 Squadron, saw no combat. The squadron, without its aircraft, returned to Britain and disbanded on arrival on 13 August 1946.

Naval Reserve
1831 Squadron reformed at RNAS Stretton in Cheshire on 1 June 1947 as part of the Royal Navy Volunteer Reserve, equipped with Supermarine Seafire fighters and a single North American Harvard trainer. The squadron, which had its strength supplemented by single examples of the Hawker Sea Fury and Fairey Firefly in 1948, carried out a training deployment aboard  in September 1949 and again in August–September 1950. The Squadron re-equipped with the Sea Fury in August 1951 and in June 1952, became part of the newly established Northern Air Division of the RNVR, being joined by 1841 Squadron, equipped with Fireflies in the anti-submarine role, in July that year. On 15 June 1953, 1831 Squadron took part in the flypast for the Coronation Fleet Review marking the Coronation of Elizabeth II, and in July that year it carried out more deck landing training aboard Illustrious.

In August 1954, the Northern Air Division was deployed to Har Far, Malta for that year's 14-day continuous training period. That month it also replaced its Harvard trainers with Boulton Paul Sea Balliols, which were used both for training and communications duties. From May–June 1955, the Squadron became the first jet-equipped squadron of the Royal Navy Volunteer Reserve, replacing its Sea Furys with seven Supermarine Attacker jet fighters and one de Havilland Vampire T22 trainer, while retaining its Sea Balliols. Later that year, the squadron formed a formation aerobatic team with its Attackers, displaying at five airshows that year. On 9 January 1957, it was announced that flying units of the Royal Auxiliary Air Force and the Royal Navy Volunteer Reserve were to be disbanded, with operational training ending on 10 January. As a result, 1831 Naval Air Squadron disbanded on 10 March 1957.

The Squadron reformed on 3 April 1980 at RNAS Lee-on-Solent with the role of giving continuation training to aircrew in the Royal Navy Reserve. It had no aircraft of its own, borrowing aircraft from other squadrons as required. The Squadron moved to RNAS Yeovilton on 1 April 1981 but soon disbanded.

References

Citations

Bibliography

External links
 

1800 series Fleet Air Arm squadrons
Military units and formations established in 1943
Military units and formations of the Royal Navy in World War II